Cambio is a Filipino rock group founded in 2003. The band is composed of former Eheads members Raimund Marasigan, Buddy Zabala and Kris Gorra-Dancel with Ebe Dancel and Diego Mapa.

History
When Ely Buendia left the Eraserheads sometime in 2002, remaining members Buddy Zabala, Marcus Adoro and Raimund Marasigan decided to continue as an abbreviated "Eheads" by adding singer-guitarist Kris Gorra (from the indie punk girl group, Fatal Posporos. After just a few months, Marcus Adoro left the Eheads as well to indulge in his hobby-sport, surfing, and to pursue his own musical project, Markus Highway.

Despite their setbacks, Zabala, Marasigan and Gorra (later, Gorra-Dancel, upon marrying Vin Dancel from  Twisted Halo) decided to continue on, with the addition of Ebe Dancel (Kris Gorra-Dancel's brother-in-law) from Sugarfree and Diego Mapa from Monsterbot; consequently forming Cambio.

Cambio became known for songs identified with Pinoy pop culture, such as "DV" (about Divisoria, a sub-district in Manila popular for bargain-hunting), and "Call Center" (about Business Process Outsourcing employment in the Philippines).

Personnel
 Kris Gorra-Dancel – lead vocals, rhythm guitar
 Ebe Dancel  – co-lead vocals, lead guitar
 Diego Mapa – rhythm guitar, keyboard synthesizer, vocals
 Buddy Zabala – bass guitar
 Raimund Marasigan – drums, percussions

Discography 
Albums
 Derby Light (2004)
 Matic (2007)

EPs
 Excerpt EP'' (2003)

Awards

References

 ABS-CBN Interactive's feature on Cambio
 Peyup's feature on Cambio Excerpt EP Launch
 Saguijo Cafe + Bar's Cambio feature

External links
 Cambio's Official Multiply page

Filipino rock music groups
Musical groups from Metro Manila
Musical groups established in 2003